The border between Lesotho and South Africa is  long and forms a complete loop, as Lesotho is an enclave entirely surrounded by South Africa. The border follows the Caledon River, the drainage divide of the Drakensberg mountains, the Orange River, the Makhaleng River, and a series of hills joining the Makhaleng back to the Caledon.

History

The Basotho people formed a distinct polity in the 1820s under Moshoeshoe I, the first Paramount Chief. At that time Basotho territory included much of what is now the Free State province of South Africa. This territory was lost in the 1850s and 1860s in a series of wars between the Basotho and the Boers of the Orange Free State. In 1868 Basutoland (as it was then known) became a British protectorate. Except for a period of annexation to the Cape Colony from 1871 to 1884, it remained in this status until independence was achieved as the Kingdom of Lesotho in 1966.

The border between Basutoland and the Orange Free State was defined in the 1869 Convention of Aliwal North. This border was confirmed, and the border with the Cape Colony and Natal Colony defined, by High Commissioner's notice of 13 May 1870, as amended by Government Notice No. 74 of 6 November 1871. In this notice the boundaries of "British Basutoland" were described as being:

Cornetspruit, St. John's River and Tees River are now known as Makhaleng River, Umzimvubu River and Tele River respectively. Olifantsbeen, Langeberg and Jammerberg are mountains in the area between the Makhaleng and the Caledon.

Geography

Starting at Mont-aux-Sources, the border runs along the drainage divide between the basin of the Orange River (which flows to the Atlantic Ocean) and the various rivers flowing off the Drakensberg to the Indian Ocean. It follows this watershed as far as the source of the Tele River near Ben Macdhui; from there it follows the Tele to its confluence with the Orange River, and the Orange to its confluence with the Makhaleng River.

From this confluence the border runs up the Makhaleng River to a point west of Mohale's Hoek, and then along a series of hills and straight-line segments to meet the Caledon River north of Wepener. The border then follows the Caledon River, past the Lesotho capital of Maseru and the South African town of Ficksburg, all the way to the source of the river, marked by a beacon at Quaneka Neck. From this beacon it follows the drainage divide between the Orange River and Vaal River basins to Mont-aux-Sources.

All ten districts of Lesotho touch the border, as do three provinces of South Africa: the Free State, KwaZulu-Natal and the Eastern Cape.

Crossings

The official border crossings are described in the following table, which is ordered clockwise beginning at Maseru Bridge.

References

 
Borders of South Africa
South Africa
International borders